Arthur Longden (11 November 1856 – 1 July 1924) was a New Zealand cricketer. He played in six first-class matches for Canterbury from 1883 and 1886.

See also
 List of Canterbury representative cricketers

References

External links
 

1856 births
1924 deaths
New Zealand cricketers
Canterbury cricketers
Cricketers from Christchurch